The Ngarinman or Ngarinyman people are an Aboriginal Australian people of the Northern Territory who spoke the Ngarinyman language.

Country
Their central domain was the Wickham River, an early writer, W. Willshire, placing them to the west of that ephemeral watercourse. Tindale adds that they inhabited the area of the Upper Victoria River, about Jasper Creek, and to the west of the Victoria River Downs, and places their southern boundary at Munjun (Mount Sanford). Their western frontier lay at Limbunya.

Language
An Australian Institute of Aboriginal and Torres Strait Islander Studies (AIATSIS) project to counteract loss of Indigenous languages has helped produce a Ngarinyman to English Dictionary in 2019.

Alternative names
 Ngainman, Ngainmun.
 Ngrainmun.
 Hainman. (local white exonym)
 Hyneman.
 Narinman, Nariman.

See also
Ngumpit, a name used by the Gurindji, Malngin, Bilinara, Mudburra and Ngarinyman peoples to refer to themselves as a group

Notes

Citations

Sources

Aboriginal peoples of the Northern Territory